Sheperd "Shep" S. Doeleman (born 1967) is an American astrophysicist. His research focuses on super massive black holes with sufficient resolution to directly observe the event horizon. He is a senior research fellow at the Center for Astrophysics  Harvard & Smithsonian and the Founding Director of the Event Horizon Telescope (EHT) project. He led the international team of researchers that produced the first directly observed image of a black hole.

Doeleman was named one of Time magazines 100 Most Influential People of 2019.

Background
He was born in Wilsele in Belgium to American parents. The family returned to the United States a few months later, and he grew up in Portland, Oregon. He was later adopted by his stepfather Nelson Doeleman.

Career and research
He earned a B.A. at Reed College in 1986 and then spent a year in Antarctica working on multiple space-science experiments at McMurdo Station. He then went on to earn a PhD in astrophysics at the Massachusetts Institute of Technology (MIT) in 1995; his dissertation was titled Imaging Active Galactic Nuclei with 3mm-VLBI. He has worked at the Max Planck Institute for Radio Astronomy in Bonn and returned to MIT in 1995, where he later became assistant director of the Haystack Observatory.

His research has focused in particular on problems that require ultra-high resolving power. He is known for heading the group of over 200 researchers at research institutions in several countries that produced the first aperture synthesis image of a black hole.

Significant papers
Doeleman S.S., et al. (2008). Event-horizon-scale structure in the supermassive black hole candidate at the Galactic Centre. Nature 455: 78–80.
Doeleman S.S., et al. (2012). Jet-Launching Structure Resolved Near the Supermassive Black Hole in M87. Science 338: 355–358.
Doeleman S.S., et al. (2009). Detecting Flaring Structures in Sagittarius A* with High-Frequency VLBI. Astrophys.J 695: 59-74.

Awards
Guggenheim Fellow, 2012
2020 Breakthrough Prize in Fundamental Physics (one share; prize shared equally among 347 scientist of the EHT)
2020 Bruno Rossi Prize, to Doeleman and the EHT
2021 Henry Draper Medal, shared with Heino Falcke

References

External links 

 Oral history interview transcript with Sheperd Doeleman on 21 May 2021, American Institute of Physics, Niels Bohr Library & Archives

Living people
Massachusetts Institute of Technology School of Science alumni
American astrophysicists
Harvard–Smithsonian Center for Astrophysics people
Scientists from Portland, Oregon
1967 births
20th-century  American  astronomers
20th-century American physicists
21st-century  American  astronomers
21st-century American physicists